TTTC may refer to:

 Taiwan Traditional Theatre Center, a performance center in Taipei, Taiwan
 The Things They Carried, a collection of linked short stories by American novelist Tim O'Brien